Conniff Meets Butterfield is an album by band leader Ray Conniff and trumpeter Billy Butterfield. It was released in 1959 on the Columbia label (catalog no. CS-8155).

The album debuted on Billboard magazine's popular albums chart on December 14, 1959, peaked at No. 8, and remained on that chart for 32 weeks.

AllMusic later gave the album a rating of four-and-a-half stars. Reviewer Cub Koda wrote: "Showing off a jazzier side to Conniff that recalls his big-band work, this is a nice album with great trumpet work from Billy Butterfield."

Track listing
Side 1
 "Beyond The Blue Horizon" (Robin, Whiting, Harling)
 "You Must Have Been A Beautiful Baby" (Warren, Mercer)
 "All The Things You Are" (Hammerstein II, Kern)
 "Oh What A Beautiful Mornin'" (Rodgers and Hammerstein)
 "Time On My Hands" (Adamson, Gordon, Youmans)
 "Something To Remember You By" (Schwartz, Dietz)

Side 2
 "What A Diff'rence A Day Made" (Grever, Adams)
 "South Of The Border" (Kennedy, Carr)
 "Can't We Be Friends" (Swift, James)
 "Rosalie" (Cole Porter)
 "A Love Is Born" (Ray Conniff)
 "I Found A Million Dollar Baby" (Rose, Warren, Dixon)

References

1958 albums
Columbia Records albums
Ray Conniff albums